The Malvar class is a ship class of patrol corvettes of the Philippine Navy and are currently its oldest class of corvettes. In the Philippine Navy, the vessels have undergone upgrades and modifications, and have been re-categorized as corvettes. One ship, the ex-USN  was supposedly a member of this class but was converted into a non-combatant Presidential Yacht by the Philippine Navy in 1948 as RPS Pag-asa (APO-21) (later on renamed as RPS Santa Maria, and as RPS/BRP Mount Samat)

In 2021 December 10, the remaining 2 ships of this class were finally decommissioned, and so the remaining WW2-era vessels are only the 5 armed transport-types (3 LCUs & 2 LSTs) during that time. That event was supposed to mark the end of the era of using WW2 combatants but supertyphoon Odette hit the Philippines just 6 days after their decommissioning, and so BRP Magat Salamat (PS-20) was forced "to set sail again with a volunteer force composed mainly of its last crew as a temporary command post for the duration of the relief operations in Dinagat Islands which was severely devastated", as reported by Philippine News Agency.

But to begin with, the replacements for all the WW2-era vessels was originally planned for the 2000s under the 1995-2010 Philippine Military Modernization Law, however this law was largely ignored for various reasons, including overdependence on the US via their 1951 MDT and 1998 VFA, among others. Some Filipinos blamed the 1997 Asian Financial Crisis as the core reason but in actuality the Philippine economy grew by 5.2% in 1997, only contracted -0.6% in 1998, and then quickly rebounded 3.1% in 1999, and onwards; it even weathered the Global Financial crisis of 2007-2008 where, by 2009, most countries were on the negative while the Philippines managed at 1.1%, while 7.15% and 4.15% in 2007 and 2008, respectively. The modernization law expired in 2010 February 23 without even a single hint of reviving it during that time. The Philippines only thought of reviving it when the Scarborough Shoal standoff erupted in 2012 April 8.

History
The PCE class of naval ships served with the United States Navy during the Second World War.

Out of the reserved US Navy units, six were transferred to the Philippines as part of the US Military Assistance Program (PS-28 to PS-33), while five were former South Vietnamese Navy units that escaped to the Philippines in 1975.

With 40 years of active duty with the Philippine Navy, ships of this class have been involved in local and international crisis, exercises, and incidents.

Technical details
Originally the ship was armed with one 3"/50 caliber dual purpose gun, two to six Bofors 40 mm guns, 1 Hedgehog depth charge projector, four depth charge projectiles (K-guns) and two depth charge tracks.

The same configuration applied up until the late 1980s when the Philippine Navy removed most of its old anti-submarine weapons and systems, and three 20 mm Oerlikon guns and four 12.7 mm general purpose machine guns were installed, making it lighter and more suited for surface patrols, but losing its limited anti-submarine warfare capability.

These were then again replaced in the mid 1990s with two GM 12-278A diesels with a combined rating of around  driving two propellers.

Ships in class

Gallery

References

External links
 Philippine Navy Official website
 Philippine Fleet Official Website
 Philippine Defense Forum
 Opus224's Unofficial Philippine Defense Page

Corvette classes
 
Ships of the Philippine Navy